Don Valley is a town in Victoria, Australia, approximately 70 km east of Melbourne's central business district, located within the Shire of Yarra Ranges local government area.

A well known farm on Don Valley is Haining Farm, a 65-hectare cattle and dairy farm with Jersey and Friesian cows and other farm animals, located at the entrance of Don River into the Yarra River. It is no longer run as a farm, and is being regenerated into bushland for the Helmeted Honeyeater (Lichenostomus melanops cassidix) a critically endangered bird. Haining Farm is managed by Parks Victoria.

Although Don Valley has minimal development, there is the Don Valley Primary School, an archery park, and is home to a satellite fire station for the "Hillcrest" CFA brigade which serves Woori Yallock, Launching Place and Don Valley after the Launching Place and Woori Yallock brigades amalgamated in December 2007.

References

Wine regions of Victoria (Australia)
Towns in Victoria (Australia)
Yarra Valley
Yarra Ranges